The 2020 US Open described in detail, in the form of day-by-day summaries.

Day 1 (August 31)
 Seeds out:
 Men's Singles:  Diego Schwartzman [9],  John Isner [16],  Dušan Lajović [18]
 Women's Singles:  Rebecca Peterson [32]
 Schedule of Play

Day 2 (September 1)
 Seeds out:
 Men's Singles:  Nikoloz Basilashvili [22],   Guido Pella [29]
 Women's Singles:  Zhang Shuai [25],  Veronika Kudermetova [29]
 Schedule of Play

Day 3 (September 2)
 Seeds out:
 Men's Singles:  Cristian Garín [13],  Hubert Hurkacz [24]
 Women's Singles:  Karolína Plíšková [1],  Elena Rybakina [11],  Markéta Vondroušová [12],  Alison Riske [13],  Dayana Yastremska [19],  Kristina Mladenovic [30],  Anastasija Sevastova [31]
 Men's Doubles:  Łukasz Kubot /  Marcelo Melo [2],  Marcel Granollers /  Horacio Zeballos [5],  Raven Klaasen /  Oliver Marach [7]
 Women's Doubles:  Bethanie Mattek-Sands /  Zhang Shuai [5]
 Schedule of Play

Day 4 (September 3)
 Seeds out:
 Men's Singles:  Grigor Dimitrov [14],  Milos Raonic [25]
 Women's Singles:  Aryna Sabalenka [5],  Johanna Konta [9],  Garbiñe Muguruza [10]
 Men's Doubles:  Ivan Dodig /  Filip Polášek [4]
 Schedule of Play

Day 5 (September 4)
 Seeds out:
 Men's Singles:  Stefanos Tsitsipas [4],  Taylor Fritz [19],  Dan Evans [23],  Filip Krajinović [26],  Jan-Lennard Struff [28],  Adrian Mannarino [32] 
 Women's Singles:  Ekaterina Alexandrova [21],  Magda Linette [24]
 Women's Doubles:  Victoria Azarenka /  Sofia Kenin [7],  Anna-Lena Friedsam /  Kateřina Siniaková [8]
 Schedule of Play

Day 6 (September 5)
 Seeds out:
 Men's Singles:  Roberto Bautista Agut [8],  Karen Khachanov [11],  Casper Ruud [30],  Marin Čilić [31]
 Women's Singles:  Madison Keys [7],  Donna Vekić [18],  Amanda Anisimova [22],  Sloane Stephens [26],  Ons Jabeur [27]
 Men's Doubles:  Juan Sebastián Cabal /  Robert Farah [1],  Kevin Krawietz /  Andreas Mies [6]
 Women's Doubles:  Tímea Babos /  Kristina Mladenovic [1],  Shuko Aoyama /  Ena Shibahara [6]
 Schedule of Play

Day 7 (September 6)
 Seeds out:
 Men's Singles:  Novak Djokovic [1],  David Goffin [7]
 Women's Singles:  Petra Kvitová [6],  Petra Martić [8],  Anett Kontaveit [14],  Angelique Kerber [17]
 Women's Doubles:  Elise Mertens /  Aryna Sabalenka [2],  Květa Peschke /  Demi Schuurs [4]
 Schedule of Play

Day 8 (September 7)
 Seeds out:
 Men's Singles:  Matteo Berrettini [6],  Félix Auger-Aliassime [15]
 Women's Singles:  Sofia Kenin [2],  Maria Sakkari [15],  Karolína Muchová [20]
 Schedule of Play

Day 9 (September 8)
 Seeds out:
 Men's Singles:  Denis Shapovalov [12],  Borna Ćorić [27]
 Women's Singles:  Yulia Putintseva [23]
 Men's Doubles:  Rajeev Ram /  Joe Salisbury [3]
 Schedule of Play

Day 10 (September 9)
 Seeds out:
 Men's Singles:  Andrey Rublev [10],  Alex de Minaur [21] 
 Women's Singles:  Elise Mertens [16]
 Schedule of Play

Day 11 (September 10)
 Seeds out:
 Women's Singles:  Serena Williams [3],  Jennifer Brady [28]
 Men's Doubles:  Wesley Koolhof /  Nikola Mektić [8]
 Schedule of Play

Day 12 (September 11)
 Seeds out:
 Men's Singles:  Daniil Medvedev [3],  Pablo Carreño Busta [20]
 Women's Doubles:  Nicole Melichar /  Xu Yifan [3]
 Schedule of Play

Day 13 (September 12)
 Schedule of Play

Day 14 (September 13)
 Seeds out:
 Men's Singles:  Alexander Zverev [5]
 Schedule of Play

References

Day-by-day summaries
US Open (tennis) by year – Day-by-day summaries